Oskar Elofsson (born 24 September 1998) is a Swedish freestyle skier. He competed in the 2022 Winter Olympics.

Career
Elofsson began moguls skiing at the age of 11. He reached his first career podium on the World Cup tour in 2018, finishing second in dual moguls in Thaiwoo. He finished 26th out of 30 competitors in the first qualifying round in the men's moguls event at the 2022 Winter Olympics. He then finished 12th out of 20 competitors in the second qualifying round, eliminating him from the competition.

Personal life
Elofsson's older brother Felix is also a freestyle skier and competed at the 2018 and 2022 Winter Olympics.

References

1998 births
Living people
Freestyle skiers at the 2022 Winter Olympics
Swedish male freestyle skiers
Olympic freestyle skiers of Sweden